"Kick, Push" is the first single released from Lupe Fiasco's debut album, Lupe Fiasco's Food & Liquor. It was written by Lupe Fiasco and Soundtrakk, who also produced the song. It describes a love story between a male and a female misfit skateboarders. It has been referred to as "a needle in hip hop's haystack of complacent songs."

Lupe Fiasco has clarified, "...I'm not a skater and I don't want to keep putting on the faces of people who've been skating for 20 years and actually lived out "Kick, Push".

The song's backing track is built around a sample of the instrumental intro of the 1982 song "Bolero Medley" by Filipina singer Celeste Legaspi.

Awards and accolades
"Kick, Push" was nominated for Grammy Awards in 2007 for Best Rap Solo Performance and Best Rap Song. It lost the first to T.I.'s "What You Know", and the second to Ludacris' "Money Maker". It was listed at #15 on Pitchfork Media's "The Top 100 Tracks of 2006" list and was also voted #72 on About.com's Top 100 Rap Songs.Remixes and freestyles
The official remix of the song features Pharrell, it was included the CD single of his 3rd single, "Daydreamin'".

Drake made his own remix of the song and featured it on his 2006 mixtape Room for Improvement.

Chamillionaire also released a freestyle titled The Greatest on his Mixtape Messiah 4.

Young Buck did a short Remix of the Song on the mixtape RBK Artist Spotlight Vol. 1.

Bassnectar has also released a remix of this song.

Track listing
CD: 1
"Kick, Push"
"Tilted" (non-album track)

CD: 2
"Kick, Push"
"Spazz Out" (non-album track)
"Kick, Push" (MyTone ringtone)
"Kick, Push" (Video)

12" Vinyl
"Kick, Push" (album version)
"Kick, Push" (instrumental)
"Kick, Push" (a cappella)
"Titled" (non-album track)

Charts

Soundtrack appearances
Lupe Fiasco performed the song on the TV show One Tree Hill'' (season 4, episode 4).

Kick, Push was featured on the soundtrack of EA Sports NBA Live 07.

Titled was featured on the soundtrack of Need for Speed: Most Wanted and NBA Live 06.

It was featured on the soundtrack of Tony Hawk's Downhill Jam.

References

External links
 

2006 debut singles
2006 songs
Lupe Fiasco songs
Songs written by Lupe Fiasco